Ikot Obio Eka is a village in Etinan local government area of Akwa Ibom State, Nigeria

References 

Villages in Akwa Ibom